Beulah London is a British fashion brand founded by Natasha Rufus Isaacs and Lavinia Brennan.

History
Beulah London is a luxury fashion brand founded in 2010 by Natasha Rufus Isaacs and Lavinia Brennan, it is a British fashion brand that specializes in creating clothing and accessories that are both stylish and socially responsible. The brand is known for its use of luxurious fabrics and its focus on ethical and sustainable production methods. The brand is also known for its commitment to empowering women, particularly those affected by human trafficking and poverty, by providing them with employment and training opportunities. Beulah London clothing is made with sustainable and organic materials, and the brand has also committed to reducing its carbon footprint and promoting environmentally friendly practices in its production process.

Initial funding for the company came from family and personal investments. In late 2011 the company announced that fashion retailer Oscar Pinto-Hervia would be investing in the company and selling their lines in his online outlet.

Customers included Kate Moss, Sienna Miller, Natalia Vodianova, Sarah Jessica Parker, Pippa Middleton, and Catherine, Princess of Wales.

Collapse
The company declared itself insolvent in April 2020 in spite of owing large sums to many small local businesses. Despite Beulah's claims to be an "ethical" company, they chose to deliberately place large orders knowing they would be unable to pay for them, leaving a trail of devastation and looming unemployment for many UK workers.

External links

References 

Clothing companies of the United Kingdom
English brands
British brands
High fashion brands
Luxury brands